XERT-AM (1170 kHz) is a Spanish-language radio station that serves the McAllen, Texas (USA) / Reynosa, Tamaulipas (Mexico) border area. XERT is a daytime only station because 1170 AM is a United States clear-channel frequency.

History
XERT's original concession dates to July 7, 1943. It was owned by Ignacio Magallón Valdivia and broadcast on 590 kHz before moving to 1170.

External links

 raiostationworld.com; Radio stations serving the Rio Grande Valley

References

Radio stations in Reynosa
Radio stations established in 1943
Daytime-only radio stations in Mexico